The Château du Rivau is a castle-palace in Lémeré (Indre-et-Loire), in the Touraine region, France. In Rabelais' Gargantua, it was given to captain Tolmere as a reward for his victories in the Picrocholean Wars.

In 1429, towards the end of the Hundred Years' War,  Joan of Arc and her followers came to fetch horses at Le Rivau. It was already renowned for the quality of its equipage and war horses who were raised here. In 1510, François de Beauvau, captain of King Francis I of France, constructed the stables in the outbuildings' courtyard that supplied royal stallions. Those stables became the royal stables of Henri III and housed his stallions. An exhibit shows the history of the King's horses and tells the visitor about the mythical horses.

Since 1992, the new owners have undertaken a renovation campaign to prevent the decay of the castle and winery. It has been classified as a monument historique since 1918 by the French Ministry of Culture.

The castle 
Its shape is reminiscent of 13th century fortified castles. The square shaped keep was the heart of the castle's fortification. The Rivau was one of the first ornamental castles to be built. In the dining hall of the Feast of Belshazzar, a biblical episode of the Feast of Belshazzar was depicted over the fire mantelpiece by a Flemish master of the 16th century.

History 
The Château du Rivau is linked to the Beauvau family. Related to the Counts of Anjou, they had the privilege to pay homage to their suzerain with a sword at their side, standing, and wearing hats. During the 13th century, the Beauvau family served the Kings of France. They were then allied to the royal family through the marriage of Isabeau de Beauvau to Jean II de Bourbon in 1454. Many of the Beauvau family members gave their lives for the kingdom. During the 17th century, Le Rivau was protected by Richelieu as his sister Françoise was married to Jean de Beauvau, lord of Rivau. Once they became princes of Lorraine, the Beauvau family left the Touraine region. Le Rivau remained in the family's possession for 247 years.

In 1510, his heir, François de Beauvau, captain of François I, constructed the stables that supplied royal stallions in the outbuildings courtyard. He died at the Battle of Sesia River, at the side of Bayard, on April the 30 1524.

In 1768, the marquis Michel-Ange de Castellane, the lord of Villandry, acquired Le Rivau. He stayed there with his family until 1796.

Humanised by the Renaissance, Le Rivau is one of the most important monuments of the Touraine region. Rabelais cites Le Rivau in one of his novels : Gargantua offers it to his captain Tolmere as a reward for his victories during the Picrocholean War.

At the turn of the 20th century, the sculptor Alphonse de Moncel de Perrin, who worked on the ornementation of the Petit-Palais in Paris, managed to have Le Rivau listed among the Historical Monuments in 1918. The painter Pierre-Laurent Brenot lived at Le Rivau from 1960 to 1992.

At the end of the 20th century, Le Rivau underwent an 18-year long restoration campaign.

Royal Stable 
Joan of Arc came to Le Rivau to fetch horses in 1429. At that time, war horses were already bred at le Rivau, where the current commons stand.

During the Renaissance period, François de Beauvau, the King's chief squire, decided to build stables (most certainly in wood) where they had existed at the time of the Hundred-Years War. He died during the battle of Romagne, to the side of Bayard in 1524. His heir, Gabriel de Beauvau daringly undertook the erection of original stables, whose plans were directly inspired from the Italian architectures, knights had discovered while fighting for the King.

Until then the Rivau's stables were only meant to be functional and had no ornaments whatsoever. One of le Rivau's main idiosyncrasies comes from the fact that for the first time in the history of equestrian architecture, stables were designed by an architect who developed a pioneer style.

Fairytale gardens
The 12 gardens of Rivau are designated a Jardin Remarquable (by a French organisation that recognises remarkable gardens). They are inspired by fairy tales and legends and take the visitors on a beautiful and fantastical journey. The Rivau fairytale gardens are also a treat for rose lovers and gardeners, as they display a collection of more than 300 roses from famous rose breeders such as André Eve or David Austin.

Art 
Le Rivau is also famous for the contemporary sculptures that are displayed around the gardens, with pieces by artists such as Fabien Verschaere, Cat Loray, Jerôme Basserode, Frans Krajcberg and Philippe Ramette.

Gallery

See also 
List of castles in France

Notes

External links
 Loire Valley Castle le Rivau  
 Château du Rivau on Google Cultural Institute
Interview with Caroline Laigneau, the owner of Chateau du Rivau

Castles in Centre-Val de Loire
Châteaux in Indre-et-Loire
Gardens in Indre-et-Loire
Monuments historiques of Indre-et-Loire
Historic house museums in Centre-Val de Loire
Museums in Indre-et-Loire
1445 establishments in Europe
1440s establishments in France